Nes is a village in Noardeast-Fryslân in the province of Friesland, the Netherlands, with a population of around 376 in January 2017. Before 2019, the village was part of the Dongeradeel municipality.

History 
The village was first mentioned in 1369 as Nesse and means headland. Nes is a terp (artificial living mound) village from the early middle ages with a rectangular structure with three paths. The Dutch Reformed church dates from the 12th century, and the tower was added slightly later. The building was restored in 1974. 

In 1840, Nes was home to 538 people.

Notable inhabitants
 Nynke van Hichtum (1860–1939), children's author

Gallery

References

External links

Noardeast-Fryslân
Populated places in Friesland